Richard Neutze (born 5 July 1969) is a biophysicist from New Zealand, now a Professor of Biochemistry in the Department of Chemistry & Molecular Biology at Gothenburg University in Gothenburg, Sweden. He has made fundamental contributions to X-ray crystallography of biomolecules, including proposal of the idea of diffract before destroy along with Janos Hajdu and others, which in part led to the invention of serial femtosecond crystallography.

Education and career
Neutze graduated with a BSc in physics in 1991 and PhD in biophysics in 1995 from University of Canterbury, New Zealand, where his supervisor was Geoff Stedman. Afterwards, he conducted postdoctoral research at University of Oxford, University of Tübingen, and Uppsala University.

Honors and awards
Neutze received the Young Scientist Award at European Synchrotron Radiation Facility in 2000, and the Hugo Theorell Prize from the Swedish Biophysics Society in 2012.

References

Biophysicists
Crystallographers
Living people
University of Canterbury alumni
1969 births
Academic staff of the University of Gothenburg
New Zealand scientists
Academics of the University of Oxford
People from Mid Canterbury
New Zealand physicists